"Pieces of a Dream" is a song by American singer Anastacia from her first greatest hits album, Pieces of a Dream (2005). Written by Anastacia, Glen Ballard, and David Hodges, the track was produced by the latter two and details a number of difficult issues Anastacia experienced while touring in 2005 such as the breakdown of her relationship and the death of her estranged father. The single was released as the album's lead single in Europe on November 11, 2005, and in the United Kingdom 10 days later. The single reached the 10 ten in Italy and the Netherlands and the top 20 in Germany and Switzerland. It also peaked at number one in Spain three years after its original release.

Critical reception
AllMusic editor Sharon Mawer said that this song is "more midtempo but it suffers from a lack of a discernible melody."

Music video
The music video for "Pieces of a Dream" was directed by David Lippman and Charles Mehling, and was filmed in Los Angeles, California, between September 17–18, 2005. Shot entirely in black-and-white, the video is mostly set in dark woods, and has no coherent storyline, featuring a series of mysterious images—perhaps to literally interpret the song's title. 

The video depicts Anastacia's descent into madness, and the hallucinations she has, such as a frozen rose and images of herself burning. It is later revealed that Anastacia is being held in a padded cell, and that the video is actually a part of her dream.

Track listing
UK and European CD single
 "Pieces of a Dream"
 "Club Megamix"

Credits and personnel
Credits are lifted from the UK CD single liner notes.

Studio
 Recorded at Ocean Way Studios (Los Angeles)

Personnel

 Anastacia – writing, executive production
 Glen Ballard – writing, production
 David Hodges – writing, piano, keyboards, production
 Joel Shearer – guitars
 Sean Hurley – bass
 Mark Colbert – drums
 Bill Malena – recording
 Scott Campbell – additional recording
 Tom Lord-Alge – mixing
 Jeff Burns – assistant engineering

Charts

Weekly charts

Year-end charts

Release history

References

2005 singles
2005 songs
Anastacia songs
Black-and-white music videos
Epic Records singles
Number-one singles in Spain
Song recordings produced by Glen Ballard
Songs written by Anastacia
Songs written by David Hodges
Songs written by Glen Ballard